Cassida denticollis is a species of leaf beetle, situated in the subfamily Cassidinae (tortoise beetles) and the genus Cassida, found in Mongolia, West China (Xinjiang province), and the Western Palaearctic region.

Description
Cassida denticollis, like all species of Cassisa has its head covered by the pronotum and wide elytral margins. It measures 5.1–7.0 mm in length, is green in colour with brownish-red areas around the scutellum. It has a distinct tooth at the rear edge of the pronotum, and a series of small, strong, blunt teeth on the front edges of the elytra from which this species derives its name.

Habitat and lifecycle
The species feeds on plants from the family Asteraceae, including Achillea millefolium, Artemisia absinthium, Artemisia campestris and various plants Tanacetum species, including Tanacetum corymbosum and Tansy.

References

Cassidinae
Beetles described in 1844
Beetles of Asia
Taxa named by Christian Wilhelm Ludwig Eduard Suffrian